Festucula is a genus of jumping spiders that was first described by Eugène Louis Simon in 1901.

Species
 it contains eight species, found only in Africa and Israel:
Festucula australis Lawrence, 1927 – Congo, Angola, Namibia
Festucula festuculaeformis (Lessert, 1925) – Eastern Africa
Festucula haddadi Azarkina & Foord, 2014 – South Africa
Festucula lawrencei Lessert, 1933 – Angola
Festucula leroyae Azarkina & Foord, 2014 – Botswana, South Africa
Festucula lineata Simon, 1901 – Senegal to Nigeria
Festucula robustus Azarkina & Foord, 2014 – South Africa
Festucula vermiformis Simon, 1901 (type) – Egypt, Sudan, Israel

References

Salticidae genera
Salticidae
Spiders of Africa